Kyle D. Pruett is an author of books and columns on parenting, and is a professor of child psychiatry at Yale University. This researcher and practicing psychiatrist was the host of the TV series Your Child Six to Twelve with Dr. Kyle Pruett. He has contributed to Good Housekeeping, Child, and The New York Times. He has appeared as a guest on Good Morning America, Oprah, CBS This Morning, and National Public Radio.

Controversies
Pruett has rebutted the use of his work by various opponents of same-sex marriage, saying that such usage distorted his work or was an exercise in cherry-picking.

Publications
 Fatherneed: Why Father Care Is as Essential as Mother Care for Your Child - c. 2000
 Me, Myself and I: How Children Build Their Sense of Self: 18 to 36 Months - c. 1999
 The Nurturing Father: Journey Toward the Complete Man - c.1986

References

External links
 Dr. Kyle Pruett.com
 The Yale Child Study Center
 The Goddard School
 Zero to Three: The National Center for Infants, Toddlers and Families

Living people
Year of birth missing (living people)
American psychiatrists
Yale University faculty